The Gimone is a  river in south-western France, left tributary of the Garonne. Its source is in the foothills of the Pyrenees, near Lannemezan. It flows north through the following départements and towns:

 Hautes-Pyrénées
 Gers: Saramon, Gimont
 Tarn-et-Garonne: Beaumont-de-Lomagne

The Gimone flows into the Garonne near Castelsarrasin.

References

Rivers of France
Occitanie region articles needing translation from French Wikipedia
Rivers of Occitania (administrative region)
Rivers of Haute-Garonne
Rivers of Gers
Rivers of Hautes-Pyrénées
Rivers of Tarn-et-Garonne